Saddle Peak is a set of twin peaks with a distinct saddle between them, located  northwest of Mount Kostka in western Anare Mountains, on the coast of Victoria Land, in Antarctica. 

It was named in 1962 by the Australian National Antarctic Research Expeditions, operating from the research ship MV Thala Dan.

Mountains of Victoria Land
Pennell Coast